Rory is a given name of Gaelic origin. The meaning of the name is "red king", composed of ruadh ("red") and rígh ("king"). 

In Ireland and Scotland, it is generally seen as a masculine name and therefore rarely given to females.

History
An early use of the name in antiquity is in reference to Rudraige mac Sithrigi, a High King of Ireland who eventually spawned the Ulaid (indeed, this tribe are sometimes known as Clanna Rudhraighe). Throughout the Middle Ages, the name was in use by various kings, such as Ruaidrí mac Fáeláin, Ruaidrí na Saide Buide and Ruaidrí Ua Conchobair, the last High King of Ireland. As well as this, Ruairí Óg Ó Mórdha, the famous King of Laois, and his nephew Ruairí Ó Mórdha, who was a leader in the Irish Rebellion of 1641, held the name.

Rory has seen increasing use in females since the 1960s, especially in the United States. One notable example is Rory Kennedy (b. 1968), daughter of Robert F. Kennedy. It can alternatively be a nickname for "Aurora" or "Lorelai".

Variations
In Classical Gaelic, the name was written Ruaidhrigh, and in Old Irish Ruaidríg /ruaðʲr͈ʲiːʝʲ/ (Proto Celtic *roudo-riks). There are numerous other recorded variations of the name such as Ruaidrí, Ruaidhrí, Ruairdhrí, Rhuairidh, Ruaridh, Rhuari, Rhuaridh, Ruarídh, Ruarí, Roighrí, Rauridh or Raighrí. Historically, it has also been anglicised by replacement with the Germanic name Roderick, of similar meaning (leader) and in some cases the also etymologically unrelated names Roger and Ray.

List of people

Ruaidrí
Ruaidrí mac Fáeláin (died 785), King of Leinster of the Uí Fáeláin sept of the Uí Dúnlainge branch of the Laigin
Ruaidrí ua Canannáin (died 950), king of the Cenél Conaill, and according to some sources High King of Ireland
Ruaidrí na Saide Buide (died 1118), called Ruaidrí na Saide Buide (Ruaidrí of the Yellow Birch), King of Connacht
Ruaidrí Ua Conchobair, 12th century King of Connacht and the last High King of Ireland
Ruaidri mac Cathal Ua Conchobair, King of Connacht in Ireland
Ruaidri mac Tairdelbach Ua Conchobair, King of Connacht, died 1384
Ruaidri Caech mac Diarmata (1404–1421), see Kings of Magh Luirg
Ruaidri Óg mac Diarmata (1478–1486), see Kings of Magh Luirg
Ruaidri mac Diarmata (1549–1568), see Kings of Magh Luirg

Ruaidhrí
Ruaidhrí mac Raghnaill (died 1247?), Hebridean magnate
Ruaidhrí Mac Ruaidhrí (died 1318?), Scottish magnate
Ruaidhri Ó Cianáin (died 1387), Irish historian
Ruaidhrí Ó Flaithbheartaigh (1629–1716/18), Irish historian
Rúaidhrí de Valera (1916–1978), Irish archaeologist
Rúaidhrí Conroy (born 1979), Irish actor
Ruaidhrí Higgins (born 1984), midfielder playing with Derry City F.C. in the League of Ireland
Ruaidhri Smith (born 1994), Scottish cricketer

Ruairí
Ruairí Mac Easmainn (1864–1916), Irish patriot, poet, revolutionary and nationalist
Ruairí Brugha (1917–2006), Irish politician
Ruairí Ó Brádaigh (1932–2013), Irish Republican Army member
Ruairí O'Connor (born 1991), Irish actor
Ruairí Quinn (born 1946), Irish politician
Ruairí Robinson (born 1978), Academy Award-nominated Irish film director and writer
Ruairí McKiernan (born 1977), Irish social activist

Ruaraidh
Ruaraidh Erskine (1869–1960), Scottish nationalist

Ruairidh
Ruairidh MacIlleathain, Scottish Gaelic broadcaster
Ruairidh Greenwood (born 1992), Scottish curler

Ruaridh
Ruaridh Jackson (born 1988), Scottish rugby union player
Ruaridh McConnochie (born 1991), English rugby union player
Ruaridh MacKenzie (born 1994), Scottish rugby union player
Ruaridh Arrow (born 1980), British film-maker

Rory

Male
Rory Anderson (born 1992), American football player
Rory Barnes (born 1946), Australian writer
Rory Best (born 1982), Irish rugby union footballer
Rory Boulding (born 1988), English footballer
Rory Brady (1957–2010), Irish lawyer
Rory Bremner (born 1961), Scottish comedian
Rory Brennan (born 1945), Irish poet
Rory Brien (born 1991), rugby league footballer
Rory Burns (born 1990), English cricketer
Rory Byrne (born 1944), South African racing car designer
Rory Calhoun (1922–1999), American actor
Rory Carroll (born 1972), Irish journalist
Rory Cellan-Jones (born 1958), British journalist
Rory Cochrane (born 1972), American actor
Rory Collins (born 1955), epidemiologist
Rory Enrique Conde (born 1965), Colombian serial killer
Rory Culkin (born 1989), American actor
Rory Delap (born 1976), Irish football player
Rory Dodd, Canadian rock vocalist
Rory Fairweather-Neylan (born 1987), Australian ballet dancer
Rory Fallon (born 1982), New Zealand football player
Rory Feely (born 1997), Irish association football player
Rory Fitzpatrick (born 1975), American ice hockey player
Rory Gallagher (1948–1995), Irish musician
Rory Hamilton-Brown (born 1987), English cricketer
Rory Jacob (born 1983), Irish hurler
Rory Jennings (born 1983), British actor
Rory Johnson (born 1986), American football player
Rory Jones (born 1955), South African football player
Rory Kiely (1934–2018), Irish politician
Rory Kinnear (born 1978), English actor
Rory Kockott (born 1986), South African rugby player representing France internationally
Rory Lamont (born 1982), Scottish rugby player
Rory Lawson (born 1981), Scottish international rugby union player
Rory Lee Feek (born 1966), American country music singer and songwriter
Rory Leidelmeyer, American bodybuilder
Rory Loy (born 1988), Scottish footballer
Rory Macdonald (conductor) (born 1980), Scottish conductor
Rory MacDonald (fighter) (born 1989), Canadian professional mixed martial artist
Rory Macdonald (musician) (born 1949), Scottish bassist
Rory MacGregor (born 1976), British actor
Rory MacLean (born 1954), Canadian writer
Rory Makem (born 1969) Irish-American musician
Rory Markas (1955–2010), American sportscaster
Rory Markham (born 1982), American mixed martial artist
Rory McCann (born 1969), Scottish actor
Rory McEwen (politician) (born 1948), Australian politician
Rory McEwen (artist) (1932–1982), Scottish artist and musician
Rory McGrath (born 1956), English comedian
Rory McIlroy (born 1989), Northern Irish golfer
Rory McLeod (singer-songwriter) (born 1957), English singer-songwriter
Rory McLeod (snooker player) (born 1971), English professional snooker player
Rory McTurk, British philologist
Rory O'Connor (Irish republican) (1883–1922), Irish republican activist
Rory O'Hanlon (born 1934), Irish politician
Rory O'Malley (born 1980), Broadway actor
Rory (Roger) O'Moore (1620–1655), Irish rebel
Rory O'Tunny (c. 1541–1542), Irish sculptor
Rory Peck (1956–1993), British journalist
Rory Reid (born 1963), American politician
Rory Sabbatini (born 1976), South African golfer
Rory J Saper (born 1996), English actor
Rory Schlein (born 1984), Australian speedway rider
Rory Singer (born 1976), American mixed martial artist
Rory Sparrow (born 1958), American basketball player
Rory Smith (born 1987), Canadian lacrosse player
Rory Steele (born 1943), Australian author
Rory Stewart (born 1973), British politician, diplomat and author
Rory Storm (1938–1972), English musician
Rory Sutherland (born 1982), Australian racing cyclist
Rory Underwood (born 1963), English rugby player
Rory Watson (born 1996), English footballer

Female
Aurora 'Rory' Block (born 1949), American blues guitarist and singer
Ellen "Rory" Flack (born 1971), American figure skater
Rory Kennedy (born 1968), American filmmaker
Rory Quintos (born 1962), Filipino television and film director

Characters

Male characters 
Brother Rua in the film Pilgrimage
Rory in the Australian children's television series Little Lunch
Rory in the book series The Hunger Games
Rory in the film/television series My Babysitter's a Vampire
Rory Adams in the movie Life
Rory Breaker in the movie Lock, Stock and Two Smoking Barrels
Rory Campbell in the Marvel Comics Universe
Roary in the television show Roary the Racing Car
Ruairí Donovan in the British radio soap opera The Archers
Ruairi, a central character in the MMORPG Mabinogi, appearing in the introductory storyline and several others subsequently. 
Rory Finnigan in the television series Hollyoaks
Rory Flanagan in the television series Glee
Rory Hennessy in the television series 8 Simple Rules
Rory Jansen in the movie The Words
Rory Murdoch in the television series River City
Rory O'Shea in the movie Inside I'm Dancing
Rory Peters in the movie Final Destination 2
Rory Regan, Ragman in the DC Comics Universe
Rory Slippery in the television series Fortysomething
Rory Williams in the television series Doctor Who
Rory Walker in the movie The Conjuring
Rory Browne in the books of the saga of Agnes Browne (The Mammy, The Chisellers, The Granny and The Young Wan) by Brendan O'Carroll
Rory in the former Disney video game Club Penguin

Female characters 
Lorelai "Rory" Gilmore in the television series Gilmore Girls
Rory Mercury in the anime and light novel series Gate.
Aurora "Rory" Morningstar, from the series "Lucifer."

See also
 List of Irish-language given names
 List of Scottish Gaelic given names

References

Irish masculine given names
Scottish Gaelic masculine given names
Scottish masculine given names